Bacchisa is a genus of longhorn beetles of the subfamily Lamiinae.

subgenus Atrobacchisa
 Bacchisa atrocoerulea (Gressitt, 1951)
 Bacchisa holorufa Breuning, 1968

subgenus Bacchisa
 Bacchisa albicornis (Pascoe, 1867)
 Bacchisa andamanensis Breuning, 1956
 Bacchisa annulicornis (Pascoe, 1867)
 Bacchisa argenteifrons (Gahan, 1907)
 Bacchisa assamensis Breuning, 1956
 Bacchisa atricornis Breuning, 1961
 Bacchisa atritarsis (Pic, 1912)
 Bacchisa aureosetosa Breuning, 1961
 Bacchisa basalis (Gahan, 1894)
 Bacchisa bicolor (Schwartz, 1931)
 Bacchisa bicoloripennis Breuning, 1968
 Bacchisa bimaculata (Pascoe, 1867)
 Bacchisa chinensis Breuning, 1948
 Bacchisa comata (Gahan, 1901)
 Bacchisa coronata Pascoe, 1866
 Bacchisa curticornis Breuning, 1956
 Bacchisa cyaneoapicalis (Gressitt, 1939)
 Bacchisa cyanicollis Breuning, 1956
 Bacchisa cyanipennis Breuning, 1961
 Bacchisa dapsilis (Newman, 1842)
 Bacchisa dilecta (Newman, 1842)
 Bacchisa dioica (Fairmaire, 1878)
 Bacchisa discoidalis (Thomson, 1865)
 Bacchisa flavescens Breuning, 1968
 Bacchisa flavicincta (Pascoe, 1867)
 Bacchisa flavobasalis Breuning, 1956
 Bacchisa fortunei (Thomson, 1857)
 Bacchisa frontalis (Gahan, 1895)
 Bacchisa fruhstorferi Breuning, 1959
 Bacchisa guerryi (Pic, 1911)
 Bacchisa hoffmanni (Gressitt, 1939)
 Bacchisa humeralis Breuning, 1956
 Bacchisa klapperichi Breuning, 1956
 Bacchisa kusamai Saito, 1999
 Bacchisa kweichowensis Breuning, 1959
 Bacchisa laevicollis Breuning, 1956
 Bacchisa medioviolacea Breuning, 1965
 Bacchisa melanura (Pascoe, 1867)
 Bacchisa mindanaonis Breuning, 1959
 Bacchisa nigricornis Breuning, 1969
 Bacchisa nigriventris (J. Thomson, 1865)
 Bacchisa nigroantennata Breuning, 1963
 Bacchisa nigroapicipennis Breuning, 1960
 Bacchisa nigrosternalis Breuning, 1956
 Bacchisa pallens (Chen, 1936)
 Bacchisa pallidiventris (Thomson, 1865)
 Bacchisa papuana Breuning, 1956
 Bacchisa partenigricornis Breuning, 1968
 Bacchisa parvula (Schwarzer, 1926)
 Bacchisa pennicillata (Aurivillius, 1927)
 Bacchisa perakensis Breuning, 1956
 Bacchisa pouangpethi Breuning, 1963
 Bacchisa pseudobasalis Breuning, 1956
 Bacchisa punctata (Thomson, 1865)
 Bacchisa rigida (Gressitt, 1942)
 Bacchisa seclusa (Pascoe, 1867)
 Bacchisa siamensis Breuning, 1959
 Bacchisa subannulicornis Breuning, 1964
 Bacchisa subbasalis Breuning, 1956
 Bacchisa subpallidiventris Breuning, 1968
 Bacchisa sumatrensis Breuning, 1950
 Bacchisa testacea (J. Thomson, 1857)
 Bacchisa tonkinensis Breuning, 1956
 Bacchisa transversefasciata Breuning, 1960
 Bacchisa unicolor Breuning, 1956
 Bacchisa venusta (Pascoe, 1867)
 Bacchisa vernula (Pascoe, 1867)
 Bacchisa violacea (Aurivillius, 1923)
 Bacchisa violaceoapicalis (Pic, 1923)

subgenus Bulbobacchisa
 Bacchisa cavernifera (Aurivillius, 1922)

subgenus Cyanastus
 Bacchisa aulica (Pascoe, 1867)
 Bacchisa borneotica Breuning, 1956
 Bacchisa gigantea Breuning, 1959
 Bacchisa kraatzii (Thomson, 1865)
 Bacchisa puncticollis (Thomson, 1865)
 Bacchisa unicoloripennis Breuning, 1964

subgenus Fasciatobacchisa
 Bacchisa fasciata (Schwarzer, 1931)

References

 
Cerambycidae genera